James Bowen Brandt (September 16, 1909 - July 15, 1983) was an American politician in the state of South Carolina. He served in the South Carolina House of Representatives from 1967 to 1974, representing Allendale County, South Carolina. He was a businessman and dairyman. He was born in Ulmer, South Carolina, the son of Bowen B. and Jessie (née Black) Brandt and attended Clemson University and the University of South Carolina (B.A. 1937). Brandt died on July 15, 1983 at the age of 73.

References

1909 births
1983 deaths
People from Allendale County, South Carolina
Democratic Party members of the South Carolina House of Representatives
20th-century American politicians